Phanerotomeina is a subtribe of darkling beetles in the family Tenebrionidae. There are about 5 genera and more than 150 described species in Phanerotomeina, found mainly in the southern part of the Afrotropics. Only two species were described north of the equator.

Genera
These five genera belong to the subtribe Phanerotomeina:
 Huilamus Koch, 1953
 Ocnodes Fåhraeus, 1870
 Psammoryssus Kolbe, 1886
 Stridulomus Koch, 1955
 Tarsocnodes Gebien, 1920

References

Tenebrionidae